Jackie Brown is a female former swimmer who competed for England.

Swimming career
Brown was a two times British champion; in 1971 when she won the 200 metres backstroke title (in Leeds) and in 1972 when she won the 100 metres backstroke title (in Crystal Palace) at the National Championships.

She represented England in the 100 metres backstroke, at the 1970 British Commonwealth Games in Edinburgh, Scotland.

She swan for the Hull Olympic Swimming Club.

References

English female swimmers
Swimmers at the 1970 British Commonwealth Games
Commonwealth Games competitors for England
20th-century English women